Alfredo Martín Reyes Velázquez (born 15 December 1953) is a Mexican politician affiliated with the National Action Party. He served as Senator of the LVIII and LIX Legislatures of the Mexican Congress representing Aguascalientes.

See also
 List of mayors of Aguascalientes

References

1953 births
Living people
Politicians from Guanajuato
People from León, Guanajuato
Members of the Senate of the Republic (Mexico)
National Action Party (Mexico) politicians
20th-century Mexican politicians
21st-century Mexican politicians
Municipal presidents of Aguascalientes
Aguascalientes Institute of Technology alumni